Lodovick Edward Bligh (24 November 1854 – 16 May 1924) was an English cricketer. He played ten first-class cricket matches for Kent County Cricket Club between 1878 and 1884.

Bligh was a member of the Darnley family, closely associated with Kent cricket. His father, Edward Vesey Bligh, had played for Kent and his cousin, Ivo Bligh, 8th Earl of Darnley, also played for the county and captained the England cricket team in their Ashes win in Australia in 1882/3. He attended Eton College and Cambridge University, although he did not make the cricket XI at either.

References

External links
 

1854 births
1924 deaths
Lodovick
English cricketers
Kent cricketers
Sportspeople from Dover, Kent